The Stiga Open was a golf tournament on the Challenge Tour from 1990 to 1992 and on the Swedish Golf Tour from 1988. It was always played in Tranås, Sweden.

Winners

Notes

References

External links
Official coverage on the Challenge Tour's official site

Former Challenge Tour events
Swedish Golf Tour events
Golf tournaments in Sweden
Recurring sporting events established in 1988
Recurring sporting events disestablished in 1992
1988 establishments in Sweden
1992 disestablishments in Sweden